Kirkbride School may refer to:
 Kirkbride Primary School in Kirkbride, Wigton, Cumbria, England
 Eliza B. Kirkbride School in Philadelphia, Pennsylvania, USA
 Kirkbride School in Surrey, BC, Canada - Surrey Schools